Wilson Wilson may refer to:
 Wilson Dobie Wilson (1803–1838), Scottish antiquary
 Wilson Wilson, Jr, a fictional character in the television program Home Improvement
Wilson Wilson, a fictional character in Utopia (TV series)